Portuguese dialects are the mutually intelligible variations of the Portuguese language over Portuguese-speaking countries and other areas holding some degree of cultural bound with the language. Portuguese has two standard forms of writing and numerous regional spoken variations (with often large phonological and lexical differences).

In Portugal, the language is regulated by the Sciences Academy of Lisbon, Class of Letters and its national dialect is called European Portuguese. This written variation is the one preferred by Portuguese ex-colonies in Africa and Asia, including Cabo Verde, Mozambique, Angola, Timor-Leste, Macau and Goa. The written form of Portuguese used in Brazil is regulated by the Brazilian Academy of Letters and is sometimes called Brazilian Portuguese (although the term primarily means all dialects spoken in Brazil as a whole).

Differences between European and Brazilian written forms of Portuguese occur in a similar way (and are often compared to) those of British English and American, though spelling divergencies were generally believed to occur with a little greater frequency in the two Portuguese written dialects until a new standard orthography came into full effect in the 2010s. Differences in syntax and word construction, not directly related with spelling, are also observed. Furthermore, there were attempts to unify the two written variations, the most recent of them being the Orthographic Agreement of 1990, which only began to take effect in the 2000s and is still under implementation in some countries. This and previous reforms faced criticism by people who say they are unnecessary or inefficient or even that they create more differences instead of reducing or eliminating them.

The differences between the various spoken Portuguese dialects are mostly in phonology, in the frequency of usage of certain grammatical forms, and especially in the distance between the formal and informal levels of speech. Lexical differences are numerous but largely confined to "peripheral" words, such as plants, animals, and other local items, with little impact in the core lexicon.

Dialectal deviations from the official grammar are relatively few. As a consequence, all Portuguese dialects are mutually intelligible although for some of the most extremely divergent pairs, the phonological changes may make it difficult for speakers to understand rapid speech.

Main subdivisions

Europe

The dialects of Portugal can be divided into two major groups:
They include the dialect of the capital, Lisbon, but it has some peculiarities of its own. Although the dialects of the Atlantic archipelagos of the Azores and Madeira have unique characteristics, as well, they can also be grouped with the southern dialects.
They include the dialect of Porto, Portugal's second largest city.

Within each of these regions, however, is further variation, especially in pronunciation. For example, in Lisbon and its vicinity, the diphthong ei is centralized to  instead of being monophthongized, as in the south.

It is usually believed that the dialects of Brazil, Africa, and Asia are derived mostly from those of central and southern Portugal.

Barranquenho
In the Portuguese town of Barrancos (on the border between Extremadura, Andalucia and Portugal), a dialect of Portuguese heavily influenced by Southern Spanish dialects, known as barranquenho is spoken by a small community of 1500 people.

South America

Brazilian dialects are divided into northern and southern groups, the northern dialects tending to slightly more open pre-stressed vowels. The dialects of São Paulo and Rio de Janeiro have had some influence on the rest of the country in Brazil due to their economic and cultural dominance in the country. However, migration from the Northern states to the Southern states cause the influence to be a two-way phenomenon. Cultural issues also play their roles. Speakers of the Gaúcho accent, for example, usually have strong feelings about their own way of speaking and are largely uninfluenced by the other accents. Also, people of inner cities of the three southern states usually speak with a very notable German, Italian or Polish accent, and among the inhabitants of the Santa Catarina Island (i.e. insular Florianópolis), the Azorean Portuguese dialect, in its local variant, predominates.

Between Brazilian Portuguese, particularly in its most informal varieties, and European Portuguese, there can be noticeable differences in grammar, aside from the differences in pronunciation and vocabulary. The most prominent ones concern the placement of clitic pronouns, and the use of subject pronouns as objects in the third person. Non-standard inflections are also common in colloquial Brazilian Portuguese.

Africa, Asia and Oceania

For historical reasons, the dialects of Africa are generally closer to those of Portugal than the Brazilian dialects, but in some aspects of their phonology, especially the pronunciation of unstressed vowels, they resemble Brazilian Portuguese more than European Portuguese. They have not been studied as exhaustively as European and Brazilian Portuguese.

Asian Portuguese dialects are similar to the African ones and so are generally close to those of Portugal. In Macau, the syllable onset rhotic  is pronounced as a voiced uvular fricative  or uvular trill .

Notable features of some dialects 
Many dialects have special characteristics. Most of the differences are seen in phonetics and phonology, and here are some of the more prominent:

Conservative
Some dialects of northern Portugal still contrast the predorsodental sibilants c/ç  and z  with apicoalveolar sibilants s(s)  and s , with minimal pairs such as passo  "step" and paço  "palace" or coser  "to sew" and cozer  "to cook", which are homophones in most dialects. The other dialects of northern Portugal that have lost this distinction have apicoalveolar sibilants instead of the predorsodental fricatives, found in all southern dialects of Portugal as well as in Brazil. In those dialects, they also appear in syllable codas instead of the  realizations that can be observed in all southern dialects.
In northern Portugal, the pronoun vós and its associated verb forms are still in use.
In Alentejo and parts of the Algarve (southern Portugal), one finds word-final  where standard EP has , a feature shared with BP.
Also in Brazil, Alentejo and the Algarve, progressive constructions are formed with the gerund form of verbs instead of a followed by the infinitive that one finds in most dialects of Portugal: está chovendo vs. está a chover ("it's raining").

Innovative
Furthermore, stressed  is pronounced  or  before a palato-alveolar or a palatal consonant followed by another vowel.
In northern Portugal, the phoneme  has a velar allophone  at the end of words.
 In the dialects of Beira Baixa (Southern Inland Beiras, Beira Interior Sul) (Castelo Branco), Northern Portalegre and Far Western Algarve (Barlavento area) and São Miguel Island in the Azores (aka Micaelense), the near-front rounded vowel  replaces , in a process similar to the one that originated the French u. (There is also front rounded vowel  in Beira Baixa, Northern Portalegre and São Miguel Island dialects but not in Far Western Algarve dialect or Madeira island). These are the only Galician-Portuguese and Ibero-Romance (or Hispano-Romance) dialects to have these phonemes and they are in common with Gallo-Romance ones, which differentiate them from all the other Galician-Portuguese and Ibero-Romance dialects.(see note at the end of the article)

 Micaelense Portuguese also features other sounds in its vowel inventory that is unique to all Portuguese dialects (like the nasal ). The Micaelense vowel front rounded vowel  replaces the Standard European Portuguese close-mid back rounded vowel  in words spelt with ou/oi, as in outra or boi. Although all Azorean dialects are usually grouped together as a whole (for the sake of geographical grouping), these two characteristics are emblematic mostly of Micaelense Portuguese only, and is not the case in the way speakers of Azorean dialects from the other eight islands speak. However both  and  phonemes are also present in the some parts (locolects) of other islands, in Terceira, Graciosa, Eastern Pico, Flores and Corvo, but are totally absent in the islands of Santa Maria (although close and south of São Miguel, Santa Maria island dialect is very different from São Miguel), Faial, São Jorge and Western Pico. (see note at the end of the article)
In northern Portugal, the close vowels  and  may be pronounced as diphthongs, such as in "Porto", pronounced , "quê": ,  "hoje":  or even 
Some dialects of southern Portugal have gerund forms that inflect for person and number: em chegandos (when you arrive), em chegândemos (when we arrive), em chegandem (when you/they arrive). They are not used in writing.
There are some dialectal differences in how word final [u] is realized. In Brazilian Portuguese, it is always pronounced. In Portugal, it is usually most audible when at the end of an utterance. In other contexts, it may be realized not at all or as mere labialization of the preceding consonant. The northern dialects tend to maintain it in most contexts. In the southernmost region of the country, the Algarve, the vowel is completely lost: .
Similarly, degrau "step" and jornal "journal" rhyme, which results in false plurals such as degrais "steps" (vs. correct degraus), by analogy with correct plural jornais.
The pronunciation of syllable-initial and syllable-final r varies considerably with dialect. See Guttural R in Portuguese, for details. Syllable-initial ⟨r⟩ and doubled ⟨rr⟩ are pronounced as a guttural  in most cities in Portugal, but as a traditional trill  in rural Portugal. In Brazil, the sound is normally pronounced as an unvoiced guttural, which is also used for ⟨r⟩ at the end of syllables (except in the caipira dialect, which uses an alveolar approximant , and the gaúcho dialect, which uses an alveolar flap  or trill ). ⟨r⟩ at the end of words, in Brazil, is normally silent or barely pronounced. In Macau, where Portuguese is spoken mostly as a second language, initial and intervocalic "r" is sometimes replaced with a diphthong, and ⟨r⟩ at the end of words (esp. when final-stressed) is sometimes silent.
Varieties in the Portuguese spoken in Uruguay share many similarities with the countryside dialects of the southern Brazilian state of Rio Grande do Sul, such as the denasalization of final unstressed nasal vowels, replacement of lateral palatal /ʎ/ with semivowel /j/, no raising of final unstressed /e/, alveolar trill /r/ instead of the guttural R, and lateral realization of coda /l/ instead of L-vocalization. Some of these sounds do not exist in Portugal.
The pronunciation of syllable-final s/x/z also varies with dialect. See Portuguese phonology for details. Portugal and Rio de Janeiro favor , both before a consonant and finally.  Most other parts of Brazil favor , but in the Northeast,  is often heard before consonants, especially  (but not at the end of words).
Other affected examples are faz "he does", dez "ten", nós "we", voz "voice", luz "light", Jesus "Jesus", etc. Related forms like fazem, vozes, nosso are unaffected since  is no longer final.
In Cape Verde /l/ is laminal dental [l̪], i.e., it is pronounced with the tip of the tongue touching the upper teeth. It is similar to the "l" sound in Spanish, French or German. The "l" sound in Portugal is velarized alveolar [ɫ͇], i.e., it is pronounced with the tip of the tongue touching the alveolar ridge, well behind the upper teeth, with the tongue making a curve with the concavity pointing up, and the back of the tongue approaching the vellum.
Informal Brazilian Portuguese makes major changes in its use of pronouns:
Informal tu is dropped entirely in most regions along with all second-person singular verbal inflections. When tu survives, it is used with third-person inflections.
Clitic te  survives as the normal clitic object pronoun corresponding to você.
Clitic pronouns almost always precede the verb. Post-verbal clitics and mesoclisis are seen only in formal contexts.
Possessives seu, sua virtually always mean "your". To say "his, her", constructions like o carro dele "his car" or o carro dela "her car" are used.
Third-person clitics o, a, os, as and combined clitics like mo, no-lo are virtually never heard in speech. Instead, the clitics are simply omitted, especially to refer to objects; or a subject pronoun is placed after the verb: Eu levo "I'll get it"; Vi ele "I saw him".
In East Timor, the phoneme /ʒ/ sometimes realized as [z], sometimes as [dʒ], is typical of the Creole of Malacca and Singapore and also the Creole of Bidau and the same realization was also found of Portuguese spoken on the island, for example: ʒ > z
já [za] ~ [dʒa]; vigésimo (twentieth) [vi.„zɛ.zi.mu] ~ [bi.„zɛ.zi.mu] ~ [vi.„zɛ.si.mu] ~ [bi.„zɛ.si.mu]

Homophones in dialects

Mau and mal 
Both mean bad, but mau is an adjective, mal an adverb. In most parts of Brazil, the l before consonants and ending words, which represents a velarized alveolar lateral approximant in differing dialects, became a labio-velar approximant, making both words homophones.

Júri and jure 
While júri means jury, jure is the imperative and second subjunctive third singular form of jurar, "may he/she swear". In different contexts, unstressed /e/ often became a close front unrounded vowel, but in some Southern Brazilian dialects, /e/ never goes through the change.

Comprimento and cumprimento 
Comprimento means "length", and cumprimento means "greeting". The same thing that happened with /e/ in the example of júri/jure happened to the letter /o/, such becomes a close back rounded vowel in some cases. Hispanic influence makes it never represent that sound in some Southern Brazilian.

Asa and haja 
Asa means "wing", and haja is the imperative and second subjunctive third singular form of haver, "may he/she exist". The words are usually distinguished, but in Alto Trás-os-Montes and for some East Timorese Portuguese speakers, they are homophones, both voiced palato-alveolar sibilants.

Boa and voa 
Boa means "good" (feminine) and voa, "he/she/it flies". Unlike most of the West Iberian languages, Portuguese usually distinguishes between the voiced bilabial plosive and the voiced labiodental fricative, but the distinction used to be absent in the dialects of the northern half of Portugal, and in Uruguayan Portuguese. In these varieties, both are realized indistinctly as a voiced bilabial plosive or a voiced bilabial fricative, as in Spanish.

Más, mas and mais 
Más means "bad ones" (feminine), mas means "but" and mais means "more" or "most". In Northeastern Brazil and the metropolitan area of Rio de Janeiro, the vowels followed by coronal fricatives in the same syllable have a palatal approximant pronounced between both. The feature is very distinguishable since this combination appears in the plural forms.

Xá and chá 
Xá means "shah", and chá means tea. The sound happens in other cases in Southeastern Brazil but disappeared in the rest of the Portuguese-speaking world.

Other differences 
Terms for modern elements often differ between variations of Portuguese, sometimes even taking different genders. The following is a basic description of the PlayStation videogame console:
 
In this sentence, not only is "PlayStation" feminine in one dialect and masculine in another (because "console" has different genders), but the words for "console" and "videogame" are adapted from English in Portugal (because "consola" is actually adapted from French, where the word "console" is feminine) but retained in their original form in Brazil, and "video game" in the phrase "video game console" is numbered in Portugal but singular in Brazil.

Mixed languages 
Portuñol/Portunhol: In regions where Spanish and Portuguese coexist, various types of language contact have occurred, ranging from improvised code-switching between monolingual speakers of each language to more or less stable mixed languages.

Closely related languages 

This section does not cover Galician, which is treated as a separate language from Portuguese by Galician official institutions, or Fala. For a discussion of the controversy regarding the status of Galician with respect to Portuguese, see Reintegrationism.

Portunhol Riverense is spoken in the region between Uruguay and Brazil, particularly in the twin cities of Rivera and Santana do Livramento.

The language must not be confused with Portuñol, since it is not a mixing of Spanish and Portuguese, but a variety of Portuguese language developed in Uruguay back in the time of its first settlers. It has since received influence from Uruguayan Spanish and Brazilian Portuguese.

In academic circles, the Portuguese used by the northern population of Uruguay received the name "Dialectos Portugueses del Uruguay" (Uruguayan Portuguese Dialects). There's still no consensus if the language(s) is (are) a dialect or a creole, although the name given by linguists uses the term "dialect". There is also no consensus on how many varieties it has, with some studies indicating that there are at least two varieties, an urban one and a rural one, while others say there are six varieties, of which Riverense Portuñol is one.
This Portuguese spoken in Uruguay is also referred by its speakers, depending on the region that they live, as Bayano, Riverense, Fronterizo, Brasilero or simply Portuñol.

Mutual comprehension
The different dialects and accents do not block cross-understanding among the educated. Meanwhile, the basilects have diverged more. The unity of the language is reflected in the fact that early imported sound films were dubbed into one version for the entire Portuguese-speaking market. Currently, films not originally in Portuguese (usually Hollywood productions) are dubbed separately into two accents: one for Portugal and one for Brazil (not using regionalisms). When dubbing an African character in cartoons and TV and film productions, Portuguese people usually mimic an Angolan accent, as it is also commonly seen as the African accent of Portuguese. The popularity of telenovelas and music familiarizes the speakers with other accents of Portuguese.

Prescription and a common cultural and literary tradition, among other factors, have contributed to the formation of a Standard Portuguese, which is the preferred form in formal settings, and is considered indispensable in academic and literary writing, the media, etc. This standard tends to disregard local grammatical, phonetic and lexical peculiarities, and draws certain extra features from the commonly acknowledged canon, preserving (for example) certain verb tenses considered "bookish" or archaic in most other dialects. Portuguese has two official written standards, (i) Brazilian Portuguese (used chiefly in Brazil) and (ii) European Portuguese (used in Portugal and Angola, Cape Verde, East Timor, Guinea-Bissau, Macau, Mozambique, and São Tomé and Príncipe). The written standards slightly differ in spelling and vocabulary, and are legally regulated. Unlike the written language, however, there is no spoken-Portuguese official standard, but the European Portuguese reference pronunciation is the educated speech of Lisbon.

List of dialects

See also 
Dialects
Portuguese phonology
Galician
Fala

Notes 
According to researcher Felisberto Dias in the article Origens do Português Micaelense, the dialects from Beira Baixa and Northern Portalegre (Northern Portalegre dialect is a variety of Beira Baixa dialect to south of Tagus river), Far Western Algarve, Madeira and São Miguel Island descend from the old dialect of Beira Baixa where in the 12th and 13th centuries there was some settlement by people that came mainly from Southern France (Occitan speakers) and also some from Northern France (Oïl languages speakers) that influenced the phonetics of the Galician-Portuguese dialect that was spoken in this region (very depopulated in the wars between Christians and Muslims). Some place names (toponyms) in Beira Baixa and Northern Alto-Alentejo like Proença-a-Velha, Proença-a-Nova (from Old Occitan name Proença - Provence), Ródão (from Rhodanus river), Fratel, Tolosa (from the Occitan name of Toulouse), Nisa (from Niça, Occitan name of Nice) testify a Southern France (Occitan) origin of those settlers. Those people came in the background of the Christian Reconquest (Reconquista) and Repopulation (Repovoamento) of frontier regions and were organized and helped by the military orders of the Knights Templar and Knights Hospitaller (ancestor of today's Order of Malta) among others. With the end of Christian Reconquest in Portugal (1249) speakers of this dialect came to settle in western Algarve.
When, at the beginning of the 14th century, the Knights Templar were abolished, in Portugal they were replaced by the Order of Christ (Ordem de Cristo) and many of their members were the same the only difference being that it started to be a Portuguese Crown military order. 
Later, when Madeira and Azores were discovered, Order of Christ had an important role in the settlement of the islands. Gonçalo Velho Cabral (?-before 1500) was a knight of this military order, he was from Beira Baixa Province (Castelo Branco District) and had the lordship of several lands in Beira Baixa. He was appointed hereditary landowner responsible for administering Crown lands of São Miguel and Santa Maria islands and commissioned by Henry, the Navigator (1394-1460) (then Governor of the Order of Christ) to settle with people the then unpopulated islands. Many people that went to São Miguel Island came from the lands where he was lord and spoke the ancestor of the dialect of São Miguel island.
Summing Felisberto Dias research, São Miguel island dialect (Micaelense) is the result of the settlement, in the 15th and 16th centuries, of people that were mainly from Beira Baixa and spoke a dialect that was a descendant from a Gallo-Romance phonetically influenced Galician-Portuguese dialect that formed in the Middle Ages (people from other regions of Portugal and outside of Portugal also went to settle but were assimilated by the majority).
Contrary to a very diffused but wrong idea, São Miguel island dialect is not the result of any kind of 15th century French settlement in the island (from which there is no proof).
The other islands in the Azores were largely populated by Portuguese from other regions. A small minority of Flemish were present in the initial settlement of Central Group islands of the Azores, mostly in Faial, and some also in Pico and São Jorge, but were rapidly surpassed in number and assimilated by the Portuguese settlers some decades after the initial settlement of the islands in the 15th century. Because of that, Flemish (southern dialect of Dutch) did not phonetically influenced the Portuguese dialects of these islands and on the contrary, Faial island dialect is close to the dialect that is the basis of standard Portuguese.

References

Further reading

External links 
 Dialects of Portuguese at the website of the Instituto Camões
 Audio samples of the dialects of Portugal at the website of the Instituto Camões
 Audio samples of the dialects from outside Europe at the website of the Instituto Camões
 Audio samples of Brazilian Portuguese, European Portuguese, and Galician at the website of the Associaçom Galega da Língua
 A Pronúncia do Português Europeu at the website of the Instituto Camões
 Isoglosses of the main dialects in Portugal at the website of the Instituto Camões